Bouillier is a surname of French origin. Notable people with the surname include:

 Francisque Bouillier (1813–1899), French philosopher
 Grégoire Bouillier (born 1960), French memoirist

See also
 Bobillier (disambiguation)
 

Surnames of French origin